TootArd (Arabic: توت أرض, strawberry) is a Syrian Arabic rock band from Majdal Shams in the Israeli-occupied Golan Heights, now based in Bern and Haifa. The band was founded by brothers Hasan and Rami Nakhleh. To date, the band has released three albums: Nuri Andaburi (2011),  Laissez Passer (2017), and Migrant Birds (2020).

History

Background 
TootArd, Arabic for "Strawberry", was formed in 2010 by brothers Hasan and Rami Nakhleh. All band members grew up in Majdal Shams. The band started by performing in the Golan Heights, later travelling to Jerusalem and Europe.

Nuri Andaburi (2011) 
In 2011, TootArd released their first international album Nuri Andaburi. Many of the songs in this album depict the present political situation that the band members grew up in. Some of the songs are more idealistic and imagine a time when humans were more tolerant towards each other and "closer to Nature".

Laissez Passer (2017) 
In 2017, TootArd released their second international album Laissez Passer. The album addresses the statelessness of the Druze people of the northern Golan Heights. Laissez Passer, French for "Let Them Pass", refers to the document that Golan Heights inhabitants hold and use to move around.

Musical style 
The band's style is mixed. Their first album, Nuri Andaburi, is heavily inspired by reggae music. Their second album, Laissez Passer, combines Tuareg style with psychedelic rock. In general, the band refers to their style as "mountain rock reggae", in reference to their limestone mountainside hometown.

See also 
Music of Syria

References 

Musical groups established in 2010
Psychedelic rock music groups
Syrian rock music groups
Golan Heights